Ginn Hale is an American writer of speculative fiction.

Early life
Hale spent a portion of her early childhood living in an off the grid cabin in California. Her father was fond of inventing humorous story-based games around figures from American History, including the game "Assassinate President Taft."

Career
Her debut book, Wicked Gentlemen (Blind Eye Books, 2007) is made up of two closely connected novellas blending elements of the steampunk, paranormal, gay romance and suspense genres, and won the 2008 Gaylactic Spectrum Award for best novel, in addition to being selected as a finalist for the Lambda Literary Award the same year. She then collaborated with Astrid Amara and Nicole Kimberling on two shared-world anthologies for Loose Id, called Hell Cop and Hell Cop 2. In 2010, she returned to Blind Eye Books to release the Lord of the White Hell (Cadeleonian series) Books One and Two. In 2011, she released a 10-part serialized novel titled The Rifter. In 2014, Hale extended her Cadeleonian series with Books One and Two of Champion of the Scarlet Wolf.  She has also published a number of short stories.

Personal life
Hale now resides on the Pacific Northwest coast of the United States with her wife. She is an avid supporter of Best Friends Animal Society.

Bibliography

Novels
Wicked Gentlemen (2007): Blind Eye Books -  (print + ebook) 
Cadeleonian Series
Lord of the White Hell (2010): Blind Eye Books
 Book One -  (print + ebook)
 Book Two -  (print + ebook)
 Japanese translation: Lord of the White Hell Books One & Two (2014) - translated into Japanese under Chuokoron-Shinsha Inc.’s C-Novels imprint
Champion of the Scarlet Wolf (2014): Blind Eye Books
 Book One -  (print + ebook)
 Book Two -  (print + ebook)
The Rifter (2011): Blind Eye Books
Book One: The Shattered Gates -  (ebook)
Book Two: Servants of the Crossed Arrows -  (ebook)
Book Three: Black Blades -  (ebook)
Book Four: Witches' Blood -  (ebook)
Book Five: The Holy Road -  (ebook)
Book Six: Broken Fortress -  (ebook)
Book Seven: Enemies and Shadows -  (ebook)
Book Eight: The Silent City -  (ebook)
Book Nine: The Iron Temple -  (ebook)
Book Ten: His Holy Bones -  (ebook)
 Books One to Three: The Shattered Gates -  (print)
 Books Four to Seven: The Holy Road -  (print)
 Books Eight to Ten: His Sacred Bones -  (print)

Short stories and novellas
Feral Machines in the anthology Tangle XY: Blind Eye Books -  (print + ebook)
Touching Sparks in the anthology Hell Cop (2008) with Astrid Amara and Nicole Kimberling: Loose Id -  (ebook)
Such Heights in the anthology Hell Cop 2 (2009) with Astrid Amara and Nicole Kimberling: Loose Id -  (ebook)
Shy Hunter in the anthology Queer Wolf (2009): Queered Fiction -  (print and ebook) and online at http://www.yaoifix.com
Things Unseen and Deadly (2012): Blind Eye Books - in the anthology Irregulars with Josh Lanyon, Astrid Amara and Nicole Kimberling

References

External links

Interviews
at The World in a Satin Bag (Oct 2008)
at Reviews by Jessewave (Jan 2009)
at Fantasy Book Cafe (Aug 2010)

21st-century American novelists
American science fiction writers
American women short story writers
American women novelists
Living people
1968 births
Women science fiction and fantasy writers
21st-century American women writers
21st-century American short story writers
American lesbian writers
American LGBT novelists